VinFast LLC is a Vietnamese private automotive company  based in Haiphong. Established in 2017, it is a member of the conglomerate organization Vingroup,  one of the largest private conglomerates in Vietnam, founded by Phạm Nhật Vượng. It is the first Vietnamese car brand to expand into global markets as well as the first to expand into producing EVs such as electric cars and electric scooters.

History 
The company was founded in 2017 by Vingroup.  The company designed its models with the help of Pininfarina, BMW and Magna Steyr and participated in the 2018 Paris Motor Show. VinFast claims it will be the first volume automotive manufacturer in Vietnam as well as the first Vietnamese automaker to participate in a major international auto show.

VinFast broke ground in September 2017 on an  facility in an industrial park located on Cat Hai Island near the city of Hai Phong. The factory with paint shop, press shop, assembly shop and engine shop was built in just 21 months . The investment is US$1.5 billion in the first phase of a program to make cars and electric motorbikes at a greenfield factory on the facilities. The company claimed that it has aggregated talent from multiple established companies and is sourcing European design, engineering, and production technology partners. The first two vehicles that were shown at Paris motorshow in the fall of 2018 are the LUX SA2.0 and the LUX A2.0, designed by Pininfarina.

Additionally, General Motors recently announced a partnership between Chevrolet and VinFast. VinFast will have exclusive rights to distribute Chevys in Vietnam and will take ownership of the existing General Motors (GM Korea) factory in Hanoi (VIDAMCO). That factory will then build a GM-licensed "all-new global small car" to be sold under the VinFast name.

VinFast signed two contracts with Siemens Vietnam, a unit of Siemens AG, for the supply of technology and components to manufacture electric buses in Southeast Asian countries in August 2018.

On 21 March 2019, VinFast has sent the first batch of 155 VinFast Lux cars, 113 are completed vehicles and 42 semi-finished cars, abroad in Europe, Asia, Australia and Africa to conduct field tests for quality testing and to qualify for a 5-star ASEAN NCAP rating.

VinFast would have been the title sponsor of the inaugural edition of the Formula One Vietnamese Grand Prix, which was due to take place during the  season. The race was later cancelled due to COVID-19 pandemic.

In January of 2020, VinFast was the fifth best selling car brand in Vietnam.

On 25 February 2020, it was reported that VinFast vehicles were spotted in South Africa for field tests at Kakamas in the Northern Cape Province and in Cape Town.

On 20 July 2020, the company has gone to manufacturing ventilators, based on open source information provided through the Massachusetts Institute of Technology (MIT), for patients who have a hard time breathing due to COVID-19 with reported donations made to Singapore, Russia and Ukraine.

On 10 September 2020, VinFast announced that a loss of VND 6.6 trillion ($284 million) in the first half of the year.

In December 2020, VinFast has released preliminary images of a pickup truck being developed weeks after the Lang Lang testing centre was purchased. Other vehicles in development included a three-door hatchback, two different coupe-type SUVs, a small SUV, a four-door coupe, a couple of people movers and electric scooters. According to the Intellectual Property Office of Vietnam, the patents for these vehicles are set to expire on 14 January 2024.

According to Reuters on 30 April 2021, unnamed sources claimed that VinFast planned an SPAC based funding in the United States. VinFast's CEO could neither confirm nor deny these plans. On 28 May 2021, it was reported that the company's IPO will be delayed due to SPAC scrutiny.

On 27 July 2021, parent Vingroup announced that Michael Lohscheller, the CEO of Opel, had been appointed CEO of VinFast Global. Five months later, on 27 December 2021, it was announced that Lohscheller had resigned the position.

On 30 September 2021, VinFast reported that Cerence software will be used for its electric vehicles as an intelligence voice assistant.

On 25 December 2021, Vinfast delivered the first batch of 100 VF e34 electric crossovers to Vietnamese customers at VinFast's manufacturing complex in Hai Phong. The VF e34 marks VinFast's first EV model and the first ever electric vehicle to be manufactured and sold in Vietnam.

On 6 January 2022, reports emerged that VinFast plans to build new EV plants in Germany and the United States as part of the company's plans to retire production of gas-powered vehicles and transition fully to EVs by late 2022.

On 29 March 2022, Vinfast announced it would locate its first North American auto plant in North Carolina's Chatham County.

Headquarters moved to Singapore
On 7 April 2022, VinFast announced plans for an initial public offering (IPO) through a Singapore-based holding company with U.S. securities regulators on the second half of the year as an option to fund their expansion.

On 24 May 2022, Vinfast announced that it would be moving its headquarters to Singapore, with the company stating that "We feel that Singapore is a jurisdiction that will give investors more confidence." It's reported that IPO plans to the US is postponed to 2023.

Overseas operations
On 31 July 2018, VinFast GmbH was established in Frankfurt, Germany. The office will be in charge of distributing auto parts and other related services. On the same day it was announced that VinFast will set up branch offices in Shanghai, China and Seoul, South Korea.

In February 2020, ex-Holden engineers were being recruited by VinFast in Port Melbourne, making Australia the second overseas country to have a branch after the company moved in December 2019. The branch, known as VinFast Engineering Australia, is staffed by ex-Ford, Holden and Toyota employees and opened on 12 June 2020. On 6 May 2021, the Port Melbourne office was announced to be closed due to the COVID-19 pandemic temporarily. The Lang Lang test track is not affected by the closure.

March 29th, 2022 Vinfast concreted its plan to manufacture batteries, cars, and buses in North Carolina. The auto manufacturer will create 7,500 jobs.

Export plans
In April 2019, VinFast reported that the Lux SA2.0 and Sedan Lux A2.0 were the first two models introduced to Russia at the end of 2018. According to Auto.Vesti, the models are expected to be sold throughout Russia by the end of 2020. Vuong mentioned that electric vehicles will be sold in the country after 2021.

It was announced in December 2019 that VinFast plans to market electric vehicles to the United States by 2021.

In December 2020, VinFast has reportedly mentioned that the company plans to sell its vehicles in Australia with no date mentioned.

On 22 January 2021, VinFast unveiled three finalized designs of their electric SUV models VF31, VF32, VF33 intended for US, Canada, Germany, France and the Netherlands export markets. Of which, VF32 and VF33 are available in both gasoline and electric engined versions. These vehicles are stated to meet with the NHTSA, Euro NCAP and ASEAN NCAP 5 star-ratings as well as featuring self-driving capabilities thanks to a suite of electronic driver-assist features. In July 2021, VinFast appointed Michael Lohscheller, who previously worked as an executive of Volkswagen America and as CEO of Opel, to lead its overseas operations. The VF31 was later rebranded as VF e34 and would become available in Europe in November 2021.

Vinfast announced plans to open two VinFast showrooms in California with one showroom in Santa Monica on 24 May 2022.

On 16 November 2022, the first VinFast showroom opened in Toronto at the Yorkdale Shopping Centre.

Etymology
The name VinFast is an abbreviation of Vietnamese words:

 Việt Nam (Vietnam)
 Phong cách (Style, spelled Ph as F)
 An toàn (Safety)
 Sáng tạo (Creativity)
 Tiên phong (Pioneer)

Products

Automobiles 
VinFast announced their first two models, the LUX A2.0 and the LUX SA2.0, at the 2018 Paris Motor Show. Both models are based on previous generation BMW products with various changes and enhancements, including the extensive redesign of the chassis to meet future international safety standards. Both will come in rear-wheel drive and all wheel drive, and both will be powered by the licensed BMW N20 turbocharged petrol engine in 175 bhp and 227 bhp options. Comprehensive reliability and safety testings have been completed.  Production of both models started in 2019.

In January 2022, Vinfast announced it will put an end to the production of its internal combustion engine (ICE) vehicles lineup that consisted of the LUX A sedan, LUX SA and President SUV and the Fadil hatchback by the end of 2022. The company will instead focus research and development efforts on battery electric vehicles.

LUX A2.0 
The LUX A2.0 is an executive sedan, based on the F10 BMW 5 Series.

LUX SA2.0 
The LUX SA2.0 is a mid-size luxury crossover, based on the F15 BMW X5.

President
The VinFast President was unveiled in September 2020. It is a V8 version of the LUX SA2.0, selling as a 500 unit limited-edition, at a price of VND 4.6 billion and featuring additional luxury features over the model it is based on. The President is understood to have a GM-sourced LS3 V8 engine.

Fadil 

The Fadil is a city car manufactured under license to General Motors, as a rebadged variant of the fourth generation Chevrolet Spark/Opel Karl. It will be priced under 500 million VND (US$21,500). The first Fadils from regular production were finished on June 14, 2019, delivery to the first pre-order customers took place on June 17.

Electric automobiles

VF e34 

The VF e34 measures  in length. It comes with a single electric motor. It has a claimed range of 285 km per full charge. The front-wheel drive VF e34 is powered by a 110 kW/147 HP electric motor.

VF5 

The VF5 is an A-segment crossover city car forming the entry to the VinFast line-up. It was earlier known as the VinFast VF e32.

VF6 

The VF6 is a B-segment vehicle, first introduced to the public along with the VF5 and VF7 at CES 2022.

VF7 

The VF7 is a C-segment vehicle. Designed by Lee Jae Hoon, senior exterior designer for General Motors.

VF8 

This model came with two options, one motor or two, each of which produces 201 hp and 320 Nm of torque. The driving range is estimated to be 248~292 miles.

VF9 

The battery is a 106-kilowatt-hour unit that Vinfast estimates will deliver over 262~369 miles of range.

Collectively, in the first 48 hours of being able to sell electric automobiles, more than 24,000 orders have been placed, with 15,237 placed for the VF8 as well as 9,071 for the VF9.

Electric scooters 
VinFast has planned to produce seven different electric motorcycle models by 2019. It has signed agreements with state owned petrol distributor PV Oil to have charging stations built at existing gas stations.

Klara 

The Klara is VinFast's first electric motorcycle model launched in November 2018. VinFast signed an agreement with Bosch-Vietnam, a division of Bosch, for the supply of components. The batteries are supplied by a joint venture with LG Chem.

Two versions of the Klara are sold, featuring lead acid and lithium ion batteries respectively. The Klara features 3G and bluetooth connectivity to allow remote lock and unlock and tracking.

Ludo

Impes

Klara S

Theon 

Theon is equipped with a mid-engine and chain transmission system with a power of up to 7,100W. It can reach a power of 9,000W equivalent to 12 horsepower and a maximum torque of 22.27Nm, accelerate from 0 to 50 km per hour in just six seconds and reach a maximum speed of 90 km/h.

Feliz

Tempest

Vento

Evo200

Electric buses

VinBus

Production facilities 
VinFast operates a  greenfield factory at Cat Hai Island, Hai Phong. The factory produces, cars, motorbikes and parts for either of them. In 2017, VinFast also acquired GM Vietnam's Hanoi factory (VIDAMCO).

In September 2020, VinFast purchased the Lang Lang Proving Ground in Australia from General Motors. Vinfast purchased the former Holden proving ground for $30 million and settled on the purchase on 2 November. In October 2021, VinFast disbanded its local engineering operations and put the Lang Lang Proving Ground test track up for sale.

Controversy 
On May 2021, VinFast reported one of its customers, Tran Van Hoang, a Vietnamese YouTuber, to the police over comments that the customer made on his YouTube video about the quality of his VinFast Lux A2.0 car. VinFast claimed that the video contained "untrue content" that "affected the reputation" of the company. On the video, Hoang complained about faults in the tire pressure sensor, the windshield wipers, the wireless phone charger, squeaking doors, and he also complained about his experience with the dealer.

See also 
 Vinaxuki
 StoreDot

References

External links 

 VinFast website
  
  
  
 
 VinFast US
 VinFast EU

Vietnamese brands
Companies of Singapore
Vehicle manufacturing companies established in 2017
Car brands
Luxury motor vehicle manufacturers
Electric motorcycles
Battery electric vehicle manufacturers
Electric vehicle manufacturers of Vietnam
Car manufacturers of Vietnam
Bus manufacturers of Vietnam
Electric bus manufacturers